Zeynep Kübra Sever Demirel (born 9 July 1989) is a Turkish-Belgian volleyball player and beauty pageant titleholder who was crowned Miss Belgium 2009 and also she represented Belgium at Miss Universe 2009, where she was placed among the Top 15.

Personal
Zeynep Sever married Fenerbahçe S.K.'s goalkeeper, Volkan Demirel on 21 September 2010. They have two daughters together. She also played volleyball for Fenerbahçe.

Miss Universe 2009
She represented Belgium in the Miss Universe 2009 pageant on 23 August in the Bahamas, where she placed in the top 15. The eventual winner was Stefanía Fernández from Venezuela.

Miss World 2009
Zeynep also competed at Miss World 2009 but unplaced.

See also
Turkish women in sports

References 

Living people
1989 births
Sportspeople from Brussels
Models from Istanbul
Turkish emigrants to Belgium
Miss World 2009 delegates
Miss Universe 2009 contestants
Association footballers' wives and girlfriends
Turkish women's volleyball players
Fenerbahçe volleyballers
Belgian beauty pageant winners
Models from Brussels
Miss Belgium winners
Politicians from Istanbul
People from Molenbeek-Saint-Jean